This is a list of all covered bridges in the United States of America.

Alabama

California

Connecticut

Delaware

Georgia

Illinois

Indiana

Iowa

Kentucky

Maine

Maryland

Massachusetts

Michigan

Minnesota

Missouri

New Hampshire

New Jersey

New York

North Carolina

Ohio

Oregon

Pennsylvania

Rhode Island

South Carolina

South Dakota

Tennessee

Vermont

Virginia

Washington

West Virginia

Wisconsin

References

External links

 National Society for the Preservation of Covered Bridges